Paras Nath Rajwade  (born 19 August 1962) is an Indian politician, he is MLA of Bhatgaon, Chhattisgarh from The Indian National Congress.

On 14 July 2020, he became Parliamentary secretary, appointed by Government of Chhattisgarh.

Political career
In the year 2013, he became an MLA in the Chhattisgarh Legislative Assembly for the first time from Bhatgaon (Vidhan Sabha constituency).

See also
Chhattisgarh Legislative Assembly
2013 Chhattisgarh Legislative Assembly election

References

External links

Indian National Congress politicians from Chhattisgarh
1962 births
Living people
Chhattisgarh MLAs 2018–2023